The 2025 United States elections are scheduled to be held, in large part, on Tuesday, November 4, 2025. The off-year election includes gubernatorial and state legislative elections in a few states, as well as numerous mayoral races, and a variety of other local offices on the ballot. Special elections to the United States Congress may take place if vacancies arise.

State elections

Gubernatorial

Two states will hold gubernatorial elections in 2025:

 New Jersey: Two-term Democrat Phil Murphy is term-limited in 2025.
 Virginia: One-term Republican Glenn Youngkin is term-limited in 2025.

Legislative
Legislative elections will be held for both houses of the New Jersey Legislature and the lower house of the Virginia General Assembly.

2025 New Jersey General Assembly election
2025 New Jersey State Senate election
2025 Virginia House of Delegates election

Local elections

Mayoral elections
A number of major U.S. cities will hold mayoral elections in 2025.

Eligible incumbents
Detroit, Michigan: Incumbent Democrat Mike Duggan is eligible to seek re-election.
Minneapolis, Minnesota: Incumbent Democrat Jacob Frey is eligible to seek re-election.
New York City, New York: Incumbent Democrat Eric Adams is eligible to run for re-election.
Omaha, Nebraska: Incumbent Republican Jean Stothert is eligible to run for re-election.
Pittsburgh, Pennsylvania: Incumbent Democrat Ed Gainey is eligible to run for re-election.
Seattle, Washington: Incumbent Democrat Bruce Harrell is eligible to run for re-election.
St. Petersburg, Florida: Incumbent Democrat Ken Welch is eligible to run for re-election.

Ineligible or retiring incumbents
Jersey City, New Jersey: Incumbent Democrat Steve Fulop is retiring.
Miami, Florida: Incumbent Republican Francis X. Suarez is ineligible to run for re-election due to term limits.
New Orleans, Louisiana: Incumbent Democrat LaToya Cantrell is ineligible to run for re-election due to term limits.

Other municipal elections
Seattle, Washington: City Council
New York, New York: City Council

References

 
2025
November 2025 events